Bill 86 is a law in Quebec, Canada, which modified the Charter of the French Language to allow the use of languages other than French on outdoor public signs in Quebec, as long as French is predominant.  It was passed on June 17, 1993 by the Liberal government of Robert Bourassa.

References

Quebec language policy
Quebec provincial legislation
Bilingualism in Canada
1993 in Quebec
1993 in Canadian law